Patrick Volkerding (born October 20, 1966) is the founder and maintainer of the Slackware Linux distribution. Volkerding is Slackware's "Benevolent Dictator for Life" (BDFL), and is also known informally as "The Man".

Personal life
Volkerding earned a Bachelor of Science in computer science from Minnesota State University Moorhead in 1993. Volkerding is a Deadhead, and by April 1994 had already attended 75 concerts.

Volkerding is a Church of the SubGenius affiliate/member. The use of the word slack in "Slackware" is an homage to J. R. "Bob" Dobbs. About the SubGenius influence on Slackware, Volkerding has stated: "I'll admit that it was SubGenius inspired. In fact, back in the 2.0 through 3.0 days we used to print a dobbshead on each CD."

Volkerding is an avid homebrewer and beer lover. Early versions of Slackware would entreat users to send him a bottle of local beer in appreciation for his work.

Volkerding was married in 2001 to Andrea and has a daughter Briah Cecilia Volkerding (b. 2005).

Illness
In 2004, Volkerding announced via mailing list post that he was suffering from actinomycosis, a serious illness requiring multiple rounds of antibiotics and with an uncertain prognosis.  This announcement caused a number of tech news outlets to wonder about the future of the Slackware project.  As of 2012, both Volkerding and the Slackware project were reported to be in a healthy state again.

Slackware Linux
Michael Johnston of Morse Telecommunications paid Volkerding $1 per copy sold. After that six-month contract, Robert Bruce of Walnut Creek CDROM began publishing Slackware as a CD-ROM set. Robert Bruce later became Volkerding's partner in Slackware Linux, Inc. with Volkerding owning a non-controlling, minority, 40% share. Due to underpayment, Patrick Volkerding, "told them to take it down or I'd suspend the DNS for the Slackware store".

Walnut Creek CDROM, 60% owner of Slackware Linux, Inc., was sold to BSDi and later to Wind River Systems.

Chris Lumens and others worked for Slackware, but due to underpayment, these people lost their jobs.

For the last several years, Volkerding has managed Slackware with the help of many volunteers and testers.

Awards
In 2014, Volkerding received the O'Reilly Open Source Award.

Works
 Volkerding, Patrick, and Reichard, Kevin, Linux System Commands, IDG Books/M&T Books, 2000, 
 Volkerding, Patrick, Reichard, Kevin, and Foster-Johnson, Eric,  Instalación y configuración de Linux, Temas profesionales. Madrid: Anaya Multimedia, 1999 
 Volkerding, Patrick, Reichard, Kevin, and Foster-Johnson, Eric, LINUX Configuration and Installation, M&T Books, 1998, 
 Volkerding, Patrick, and Reichard, Kevin, Linux in Plain English, MIS:Press, 1997,

References

Interviews
 Interview with LinuxQuestions.org, 2012
 Linux Link Tech Show interview (audio), 2006
 Slashdot interview with Patrick Volkerding, 2000
 Linux Journal interview
 The Age (Australia) Interview
 Hacker Public Radio Interview, 2011

External links
 Patrick Volkerding's home page

1966 births
Living people
Linux people
Slackware
American SubGenii
Free software programmers
Minnesota State University Moorhead alumni